Michael Cooperson is an American scholar and translator of Arabic literature. He is professor of Arabic at UCLA. He has written two books: Classical Arabic Biography: The Heirs of the Prophets in the Age of al-Ma'mun and Al-Mamun (Makers Of The Muslim World). He has translated a number of works from Arabic and French including:
 Abdelfattah Kilito's The Author and His Doubles: Essays on Classical Arabic Culture
 Khairy Shalaby's The Time-Travels of the Man Who Sold Pickles and Sweets
 Jurji Zaydan's The Caliph's Heirs — Brothers at War: the Fall of Baghdad

Cooperson has also taught at the Middlebury School of Arabic and Stanford University.

In 2021, he won the Sheikh Zayed Book Award for translation from Arabic to English.

See also
 List of Arabic-English translators

References

American biographers
American male biographers
American translators
Arabic–English translators
Living people
Year of birth missing (living people)
University of California Near Eastern Languages and Cultures faculty